The Dayton Pro Tennis Classic' is a defunct Grand Prix-affiliated men's tennis tournament played from 1975 to 1980. It was held on indoor carpet courts in Dayton, Ohio in the United States and played on indoor carpet courts.

Finals

Singles

Doubles

External links
 ATP results archive

Indoor tennis tournaments
Defunct tennis tournaments in the United States
Grand Prix tennis circuit
Recurring sporting events established in 1975
Recurring sporting events disestablished in 1980
Sports competitions in Dayton, Ohio
1975 establishments in Ohio
1980 disestablishments in Ohio